Leyti-Kazma is a village in the Quba Rayon of Azerbaijan.

References 

Populated places in Quba District (Azerbaijan)